Arthur Hamilton Butler  was an Irish bishop in the Church of Ireland in the second half of the 20th century.

Born on 8 March 1912 and educated at Friars School, Bangor and Trinity College, Dublin,
he was ordained in 1936 and began his career as a curate at Monkstown, County Dublin. London curacies at Christ Church, Crouch End and Holy Trinity, Brompton were followed by six years as Army Chaplain. In 1945 he returned to Monkstown as incumbent, a post he held until his ordination to the episcopate as the 10th Bishop of Tuam, Killala and Achonry in 1958. He was translated to be Bishop of Connor in 1969 and retired in 1981. He died 6 July 1991.

References

1912 births
People educated at Friars School, Bangor
Alumni of Trinity College Dublin
Members of the Order of the British Empire
Bishops of Tuam, Killala, and Achonry
20th-century Anglican bishops in Ireland
Bishops of Connor
1991 deaths
Irish military chaplains
Royal Army Chaplains' Department officers